This is a list of candidates for the 1938 New South Wales state election. The election was held on 26 March 1938.

Retiring members

United Australia
 John Ness (Dulwich Hill)

Country
 Ernest Buttenshaw (Lachlan)
 Hugh Main (Temora)

Independent
 Harold Mason (Woollahra)

Legislative Assembly
Sitting members are shown in bold text. Successful candidates are highlighted in the relevant colour.

See also
 Members of the New South Wales Legislative Assembly, 1938–1941

References
 

1938